Frederick Madison Smith (January 21, 1874 – March 20, 1946), generally known among his followers as "Fred M.", was an American religious leader and author and the third Prophet-President of the Reorganized Church of Jesus Christ of Latter Day Saints (renamed the Community of Christ in 2001), serving from 1915 until his death.

Smith's paternal grandfather was Joseph Smith Jr., the founder of the Latter Day Saint movement, and his father was Joseph Smith III, the first president after the Church's "Reorganization."  The first graduate of Graceland University, Fred M. earned a PhD in psychology from Clark University in 1916, setting him apart as one of the most highly educated members of his church at the time.

Smith's leadership was controversial.  One biographer has called him "a man of paradox" and "one of the most controversial figures in Reorganization history." His presidency saw the church initiate a series of major projects, but it was also marred by the controversy over what became known as "Supreme Directional Control."

Biography
Fred M. was one of nine children of Joseph Smith III and his second wife, Bertha Madison Smith. He was born on January 21, 1874, at Plano, Illinois, and baptized on July 20, 1883.

Summary of education:

1895 educated at Iowa City Academy
1896 University of Iowa
1898 BA from Graceland College — the first graduate of this college
1911 MA from the University of Kansas
1916 PhD from Clark University

On August 3, 1897, Smith married Alice Lyman Cobb (died May 4, 1926).

Succession to the presidency
Fred M. Smith became a counselor in the RLDS Church's First Presidency in 1902.  As his father's health declined, Fred M. assumed greater and greater responsibilities in the management of the church and its auxiliary institutions.  Joseph Smith III died on December 10, 1914, and Fred M. was ordained as the new Prophet-President the following spring on May 5, 1915.

Zion and the social gospel
Smith was known for his interests in applying the principles of the newly emerging fields of sociology and social welfare to the Church's thinking on the principles and doctrine of Zion. Smith was influenced by the contemporary Social Gospel movement, which endeavored to apply Christian ethics to societal problems, including social justice, health care, and care for the poor, for orphans, and the elderly.  In broad terms, Smith felt the need to address these issues as part of the overall call to "build Zion."  In this way he both embraced and modernized his grandfather Joseph Smith Jr.'s vision to build a literal city of Zion in Independence, Missouri.

In order to fulfill his vision, Smith initiated a number of ambitious programs, including the construction of the Auditorium, expansion of the Independence Sanitarium (later known as Independence Regional Hospital), construction of an old-age home in Independence originally known as "Resthaven" (now "the Groves"), and a planned agricultural cooperative in Atherton, Missouri.

As part of his modernizing program, Smith was an early adopter of radio. In 1924, the RLDS Church's radio station, known as KFIX (later KLDS), became the first church-owned radio station in the United States to be licensed.

He also presided during the difficult depression years which stalled or halted many of his projects, as the church faced issues of major financial debt.

Supreme directional control
He became embroiled in a controversy over Supreme Directional Control, regarding leadership and financial control of the church. The dispute led to a significant loss in membership due to the formation of splinter sects by those opposed to the policy. Smith became the first president of the church to submit a notice of resignation.  However, the General Conference to which he submitted his resignation, refused to accept it.

He died in 1946, and was succeeded by his brother, Israel Alexander Smith.

The Frederick Madison Smith Library is one of two libraries belonging to Graceland University, and is located on their Lamoni campus. It opened in 1966.

References

Other sources
Paul M. Edwards, Our Legacy of Faith: A Brief History of the Reorganized Church of Jesus Christ of Latter Day Saints, Herald House: 1991.
Paul M. Edwards, The Chief: An Administrative Biography of Fred M. Smith, Herald House: 1988.
Richard P. Howard, The Church Through the Years, two volumes, Herald House: 1992 and 1993.
David J. Howlett, Barbara B. Walden, and John C. Hamer, Community of Christ: An Illustrated History, Herald House: 2010.

External links
 at geocities.com (Biographical information)
An Introduction to Liberty Hall, Home of Joseph Smith III - Lamoni, Iowa
Lupton Library at lib.utc.edu (Holdings of the Frederick Madison Smith Library, Graceland University)
Graceland Home Page at graceland.edu (Graceland University)
http://www.collegexpress.com/college/graceland-university/1100775/details/ (Information on Graceland University)

Smith, Frederick Madison
Smith, Frederick Madison
American leaders of the Community of Christ
Clark University alumni
Prophet-Presidents of the Community of Christ
Smith family (Latter Day Saints)
Smith Frederick, Madison
Graceland University alumni
Doctrine and Covenants people
Religious leaders from Iowa
People from Plano, Illinois